Venous insufficiency can refer to:

 Varicose veins
 Chronic venous insufficiency
 Venous stasis